The 52nd New York Film Festival was held September 26 – October 12, 2014.

The lineup consisted of seven sections:
 Main Slate (31 films and two shorts programs)
 Spotlight on Documentary (15 films)
 Projections (13 programs)
 Special Events (6 films)
 Revivals (9 films)
 Joseph L. Mankiewicz Retrospective (21 films)
 Convergence (transmedia presentations and talks)
The Festival also included various interviews and panels. Following the departure of programmer Mark McElhatten, the experimental section was renamed from "Views from the Avant-Garde" to "Projections". The primary selection committee included Kent Jones (chair), Dennis Lim, Marian Masone, Gavin Smith, and Amy Taubin. Projections was programmed by Dennis Lim, Aily Nash, and Gavin Smith. Convergence was curated by Matt Bolish.

Sections

Main Slate

Feature-length

Shorts

Spotlight on Documentary

Projections

Special Events

Revivals

Retrospective

References 

New York Film Festival
2014 festivals in the United States
2014 in New York City
2014 film festivals